Kermia catharia is a species of sea snail, a marine gastropod mollusk in the family Raphitomidae.

Description
The length of the shell attains 4 mm, its diameter 1.5 mm.

The small delicate, white shell has an ovate-fusiform shape. It contains 8 whorls of which 2½ in the protoconch, with a pale straw color, globose and microscopically cancellate ribs. The subsequent whorls contains thick, rounded ribs, crossed everywhere by rough, spiral lirae; nine ribs and nine lirae in the body whorl. The aperture is narrow. The outer lip is slightly incrassate. The columella is oblique. The siphonal canal is recurved.

Distribution
This marine species occurs in the Gulf of Oman.

References

External links
 

catharia
Gastropods described in 1917